Dale Anthony Rominski (born October 1, 1975) is an American former professional ice hockey right winger.  He played three games in the National Hockey League with the Tampa Bay Lightning during the 1999–2000 season, scoring one assist.

Playing career
In 1994, while playing with Brother Rice High School, Rominski was named Mr. Hockey.

Rominski played four years for the University of Michigan, being named an assistant captain in his senior year. During his time in Michigan, he earned two NCAA Championship titles.

Undrafted out of Michigan, he signed with the Tampa Bay Lightning as a free agent. While playing with their IHL affiliate, the Detroit Vipers, he was recalled to the NHL. Rominski recorded his first NHL point on January 17, 2000, in a game against the Washington Capitals.

Personal life
Rominski earned a master's degree in Social Work, and works as a clinical social worker with the University of Michigan.

Career statistics

Regular season and playoffs

References

External links

1975 births
Living people
American men's ice hockey right wingers
Ice hockey players from Michigan
Michigan Wolverines men's ice hockey players
People from Farmington Hills, Michigan
Tampa Bay Lightning players
Undrafted National Hockey League players
NCAA men's ice hockey national champions